Storrsia olsoni is a species of sand stargazer native to the Atlantic coast of Brazil, being endemic to Atol das Rocas and Fernando de Noronha, where it can be found in tide pools at depths of from .  It can reach a maximum length of  SL.  It is currently the only known member of its genus. The binomial name of this species honours the collector of the type, the ornithologist Storrs Olson of the National Museum of Natural History.

References

External links
 Photograph

Dactyloscopidae
Fish of Brazil
Endemic fauna of Brazil
Monotypic marine fish genera
Tropical Atlantic
Taxa named by Charles Eric Dawson
Monotypic ray-finned fish genera